Albatross Island is an island located in the St. Brandon archipelago, a group of outer islands of Mauritius. A small fishing station existed on the island until 1988. 

On 5 June 2021, the FV Sea Master belonging to the Mauritian company Hassen Taher was shipwrecked on Albatross Island. All crew members were rescued by local fishermen stationed near the island.

References 

Islands of St. Brandon
Outer Islands of Mauritius
Reefs of the Indian Ocean
Fishing areas of the Indian Ocean
Insular ecology
Important Bird Areas of Mauritius
Flora of Mauritius
Atolls of the Indian Ocean